is a railway station in the city of Oyama, Tochigi Prefecture, Japan, operated by the East Japan Railway Company (JR East).

Lines
Omoigawa Station is served by the Ryōmō Line, and is located 5.4 km from the terminus of the line at Oyama Station.

Station layout
Omoigawa Station has one island platform connected to the station building by a footbridge. The station is unattended.

Platforms

History
Oyama Station was opened on 10 April 1911. The station was absorbed into the JR East network upon the privatization of the Japanese National Railways (JNR) on 1 April 1987. A new station building was completed in March 2000.

Surrounding area
Oyama City Hall Toyoda branch office
Shinozuka Inari Jinja

External links

 JR East Station information 

Railway stations in Tochigi Prefecture
Ryōmō Line
Stations of East Japan Railway Company
Railway stations in Japan opened in 1911
Oyama, Tochigi